This is a List of villages in Lycoming County, Pennsylvania in the United States. , Lycoming County has fifty-two incorporated municipalities: one city, nine boroughs, and forty-two townships. Thirty-two of Lycoming County's townships have a total of fifty villages and one has a census-designated place (CDP). Villages are marked with signs by the Pennsylvania Department of Transportation. CDPs are geographical areas designated by the U.S. Census Bureau to compile demographic data. Neither CDPs nor villages are actual jurisdictions under Pennsylvania law and their territory is legally part of the township(s) they are located in.

In the 2000 census, the population of Lycoming County was 120,044, making it a "Fifth Class County" (defined as "having a population of 95,000 and more, but less than 145,000 inhabitants"). It is included in the Williamsport, Pennsylvania Metropolitan Statistical Area, and its county seat is Williamsport. Lycoming County is located in north central Pennsylvania, about 130 miles (209 km) northwest of Philadelphia and 165 miles (266 km) east-northeast of Pittsburgh, as the crow flies. At 1,244 square miles (3,221 km²) as of 2007, Lycoming County is the largest county by land area in Pennsylvania (Erie County is larger, but nearly half of its area is in Lake Erie). Lycoming County is also larger than Rhode Island, the smallest U.S. state that has an area of 1,214 square miles (3,144 km²).

Villages
Brown Township (includes the villages of Black Forest, Cedar Run and Slate Run)
Cascade Township (includes the village of Kellyburg)
Cogan House Township (includes the villages of Beech Grove, Brookside, Cogan House, and White Pine)
Cummings Township (includes the village of Waterville)
Eldred Township (includes the village of Warrensville)
Franklin Township (includes the village of Lairdsville)
Gamble Township (includes the village of Calvert)
Hepburn Township (includes the villages of Cogan Station (partially, also in Lycoming Township) and Hepburnville)
Jackson Township (includes the village of Buttonwood)
Jordan Township (includes the villages of Lungerville and Unityville)
Lewis Township (includes the villages of Bodines, Field Station, and Trout Run)
Limestone Township (includes the villages of Collomsville, Oriole, and Oval)
Lycoming Township (includes the villages of Cogan Station (partially, also in Hepburn Township) and Quiggleville)
McHenry Township (includes the villages of Cammal, Haneyville, Jersey Mills, and Okome)
McIntyre Township (includes the villages of Marsh Hill and Ralston)
McNett Township (includes the villages of Chemung, Ellenton, Leolyn, Penbryn, and Roaring Branch)
Mill Creek Township (includes part of the village of Huntersville (also in Wolf Township))
Moreland Township (includes the village of Opp)
Muncy Creek Township (includes the village of Clarkstown)
Muncy Township (includes the village of Pennsdale)
Nippenose Township (includes the village of Antes Fort)
Old Lycoming Township (includes the CDP of Garden View and the village of Grimesville)
Penn Township (includes part of the village of Glen Mawr (also in Shrewsbury Township))
Piatt Township (includes the village of Larryville)
Pine Township (includes the villages of English Center and Oregon Hill)
Plunketts Creek Township (includes the villages of Barbours and Proctor)
Shrewsbury Township (includes the villages of Glen Mawr (partially, also in Penn Township) and Tivoli)
Susquehanna Township (includes the village of Nisbet)
Upper Fairfield Township (includes the villages of Farragut and Loyalsockville)
Washington Township (includes the village of Elimsport)
Watson Township (includes the village of Tombs Run)
Wolf Township (includes part of the village of Huntersville (also in Mill Creek Township))
Woodward Township (includes the village of Linden)

See also

History of Lycoming County, Pennsylvania
List of municipalities in Lycoming County, Pennsylvania

References
Unless otherwise noted, all information on area and population comes from the U.S. Census Bureau.

External links
 Official Lycoming County Website

Villages in Lycoming County, Pennsylvania
 
Pennsylvania, Lycoming County